This is a list of football stadiums in Romania, ranked in descending order of capacity. There is a large number of football stadiums and pitches in Romania, so this list is not complete. The minimum required capacity is 4,000.

Existing stadiums

 

Team in Bold: Liga I clubs.

UEFA Elite Stadium(s)

3-star UEFA stadiums

Planned stadiums

See also

Football in Romania
List of football clubs in Romania
List of European stadiums by capacity
List of association football stadiums by capacity

References

Romania
Football stadiums
stadiums